Prilepy is a rural locality and the administrative center of Prilepsky Selsoviet Rural Settlement, Konyshyovsky District, Kursk Oblast, Russia. Population:

Geography 
The village is located on the Platavka River (a left tributary of the Svapa River), 57 km from the Russia–Ukraine border, 65 km north-west of Kursk, 1 km north-west of the district center – the urban-type settlement Konyshyovka.

 Climate
Prilepy has a warm-summer humid continental climate (Dfb in the Köppen climate classification).

Transport 

The rural locality is situated 71.5 km from Kursk Vostochny Airport, 161 km from Belgorod International Airport and 274 km from Voronezh Peter the Great Airport.

References

Notes

Sources

Rural localities in Konyshyovsky District